Gobi is a small, female Chihuahua mix that began following ultra marathon runner Dion Leonard at the beginning of Stage II of the Gobi Desert Run in China in June 2016.

2016 Gobi Desert Run 

Leonard noticed the stray dog at the start of the second day of the race. He did not expect the dog to follow him. The dog ran a 23 mile leg of the race with him. At the end of the day, the dog joined Leonard in his tent. Ultimately, Gobi ran 77 miles of the 155 mile race. In Stage III, Leonard carried Gobi several times through water barriers. Gobi did not run Stages IV and V of the run, as the race had entered the desert where temperatures exceeded 52 °C.

After finishing the race, Leonard began a crowd funding campaign to raise £5,000 to bring Gobi back to Edinburgh from China. The campaign ultimately raised over £38,000. Leonard and his wife Lucja committed to donate the extra funds to welfare organizations that care for stray dogs.

Before Gobi could begin the quarantine process necessary to enter the UK, Leonard left Gobi in the care of race organisers in Urumqi, while he flew back to the UK to arrange for a leave of absence from his job in Edinburgh. While Leonard was in Edinburgh Gobi went missing, so Leonard immediately flew back to Urumqi, a city of three million people, to find her. With a search party made up of volunteers, Leonard combed the city with reward flyers and social media until the dog was found. Gobi had a deep gash on her head and was limping, but was otherwise unharmed. Leonard used some of the crowd funding money to fly Gobi to Beijing for an operation on her hip, from which she recovered. Leonard has now brought Gobi home to Edinburgh after the four month quarantine in Beijing required by UK law for unregistered strays was completed by January 5, 2017.

Media and Publications 

In October 2016, HarperCollins Publishers announced the expected publication of a trilogy of books about Gobi's and Leonard's journey together. The book titled Finding Gobi, received favourable high praise in Publishers Weekly and other reviews. The paperback version was officially launched in the US on June 1, 2017, and went onto become a New York Times Bestseller at number 3. The hardback version was released in the UK, Australia and New Zealand on June 13, 2017, reaching The Sunday Times Bestseller List. This was followed by a paperback version later released in February 2018 also reaching The Sunday Times Bestseller List. The main edition version is now available in 23 languages: English, Spanish, Dutch, Polish, Italian, Japanese, German, Finnish, Swedish, Danish, Portuguese, Simplified Chinese, Chinese Traditional, Korean, French, Vietnamese, Hungarian, Bulgarian, Croatian, Slovene, Russian, Serbian and Romanian. A chapter book edition for young adults and a children's picture book was also released in 2017. The young adult edition book won the 2017 New York City Big Book Award.

In June 2020, the podcast This is Love covered Dion and Gobi's story in their episode, "Gobi."

On March 13, 2017, Twentieth Century Fox announced that it was developing a movie based on Dion Leonard and Gobi's extensive journey together.

On February 20, 2021 it was announced that Sony Pictures and Tencent Films had purchased the rights from Fox to now make the movie.

Awards and Notable Accolades 

In June 2017, Gobi was invited with Leonard to present Gold Duke of Edinburgh Awards at Holyrood Palace alongside Prince Edward, Earl of Wessex.

In September 2017, Gobi won the Inspiring Animal Hero Award held at the Grosvenor Hotel in London. The Animal Hero Awards recognise and celebrate the most inspiring examples of bravery, dedication and resilience in the animal world.

In September 2019, Gobi was invited with Leonard by the President of Slovenia to the Open Gala Day to speak to invited guests about their story of Finding Gobi.

In June 2020, Gobi won the Shining World Marathon Award from the Supreme Master Ching Hai. The award recognises Gobi's heroic and noble example of unconditional selfless love to humankind.

In December 2020, Gobi won the Dog Of The Year award in a special feature television program named Dogs Of The Year broadcast by The CW network. Gobi's story was number 1 of the 10 dogs featured.

References

Individual dogs